Boxing is one of the sports at the quadrennial Mediterranean Games competition. It has been one of the sports competed at the event since the inaugural edition in 1951.

Editions

See also
Boxing at the All-Africa Games
Boxing at the Asian Games

External links
Boxing at the Pan Arab Games results - Amateur Boxing Results

 
Pan Arab Games
Sports at the Pan Arab Games
Pan Arab Games